ESNE Radio is a Spanish-language Catholic radio network based in the United States, owned by El Sembrador Ministries. Headquartered in Chatsworth, California, a suburb of Los Angeles, ESNE broadcasts on 14 stations in the United States, Mexico and Spain. ESNE also broadcasts a Spanish-language television channel, ESNE TV, launched in 2002.

History
On March 1, 2003, El Sembrador, led by founder Noel Díaz, began programming KHPY (1670 AM) in Moreno Valley, California, under a time brokerage agreement; it purchased that station in 2008. Díaz had previously started a weekly Catholic radio program, Dimensión de Fe (Dimension of Faith), in 1990.

In 2013, the network acquired KRXA, serving Monterey, California; the next year, it began brokering time on KURS in San Diego, later buying that station in 2016. A second southern California signal was acquired in 2015 when it picked up KTYM after Immaculate Heart Radio instead bought another Los Angeles outlet.

El Sembrador expanded into Utah by buying Ogden's 1430 AM—then KLO—for $260,000 in 2020. A third station in the Central Coast region of California will be added when the ministry closes on its purchase of KKMC (880 AM) in Gonzales, California, from Monterey County Broadcasters. Additionally, in September 2020, El Sembrador filed to buy KDCO (1340 AM) in Denver—though not its associated FM translator—for $420,000.

Stations

United States

Mexico
XEBBB-AM 1040, Guadalajara, Jalisco

Spain
88.2 FM, Almonaster La Real
104.9 FM, Gibraleón

Notes

References

2003 establishments in California
American radio networks
Catholic radio
Christian mass media companies
Companies established in 2003
Chatsworth, Los Angeles
Organizations based in Los Angeles
Catholic Church in California